Simon John Gibson (born 1949 or 1950) is a Canadian politician, who was elected to the Legislative Assembly of British Columbia in the 2013 provincial election. He represented the electoral district of Abbotsford-Mission as a member of the British Columbia Liberal Party.

Prior to his election, Gibson was a member of Abbotsford City Council for more than 30 years.

Electoral record

References

British Columbia Liberal Party MLAs
British Columbia municipal councillors
Living people
People from Abbotsford, British Columbia
21st-century Canadian politicians
Year of birth uncertain
Reform Party of British Columbia candidates in British Columbia provincial elections
Year of birth missing (living people)